The City Without Jews is a 1922 novel by Hugo Bettauer.

This is arguably his best-known novel. It portrays a satire on the acutely topical subject of antisemitism: A fictional politician orders the expulsion of all Jews from Vienna. Alexander Moulton observes "in scenes that are frighteningly prophetic, Austria borrows thirty stock car trains from neighboring countries to help in the expulsion (to the east) of the Jews and their belongings." In the book, the citizens of Vienna initially celebrated the expulsion, but sentiment changed as theaters went bankrupt and department stores, hotels and resorts suffered. The economy declined to such an extent that a popular movement arose demanding the return of the Jews. Without the Jews to blame, the ruling party collapsed; the expulsion law was repealed, and the Jews were welcomed back to Vienna.

Hugo Bettauer succeeded in creating a relatively accurate allegorical vision of the near future, although the book was intended as entertainment and as a satirical response to the primitive antisemitism of the 1920s. It immediately became Bettauer's most commercially successful work: it was translated into several languages, and sold 250,000 copies in its first year. It became one of Bettauer's most controversial works, gaining him both great admirers and bitter enemies. Nazi sympathizers attacked Bettauer and his work, denouncing him as the "Red poet" and a "corruptor of youth". The novel was made into the 1924 feature film The City Without Jews, directed by Hans Karl Breslauer; shortly after the premiere of the film Hugo Bettauer was murdered by Otto Rothstock, a former member of the Nazi Party, who was lionized by the antisemitic Austrian masses and was released less than two years after having been committed to a psychiatric institution.

See also 
The City Without Jews, a 1924 film based on the novel
Berlin Without Jews, a 1925 dystopian novel likely inspired by The City Without Jews
A Day Without a Mexican, a 2004 film on the effects of the sudden disappearance of all Mexican immigrants on American life
A Modern Exodus, a 1904 novel about Jews being expelled from the United Kingdom

References

External links 
 Gutenberg.spiegel.de Die Stadt ohne Juden – Bettauer's novel online 

1924 novels
Austrian novels adapted into films
1924 German-language novels
Austrian political novels
Austrian satirical novels
Dystopian novels
Novels set in Vienna
Jews and Judaism in Vienna
20th-century Austrian novels
Novels about antisemitism